This bibliography contains a is a list of works from American author Christine Feehan.

The Carpathian Novels 

This series tells the stories of the Carpathians, an ancient race with near-immortal lifespans that feeds on human blood. However, the Carpathians are nearing extinction due to a scarcity of females to mate with. With their lifemates, male Carpathians live emotion-filled colorful lives. Without them, the males fight the madness that causes them to choose between suicide or the thrill of killing humans by draining their blood, becoming soulless vampires in the process. Learning that special human women can possibly become lifemates, the Carpathians realize there may be hope of saving their species from extinction.

Sea Haven Novels 

These novels take place in (or the vicinity of) the town of Sea Haven. Each book is included in one of the three series forming this collection: the Drake Sisters, the Sisters of the Heart, and Torpedo Ink.

The Drake Sisters

The first series, Drake Sisters, focuses on the seven Drakes sisters, discovering their magical powers and finding the men they are destined to be with.

Sisters of the Heart

In the second Sea Haven series, six women meet after each is the victim of a violent crime. In the process of working through their grief, they form a sisterhood, learning to love and trust each other. Each novel is about one of the women and her chosen man, one of the Prakenskii brothers.

Torpedo Ink

The third series focuses on the Torpedo Ink motorcycle club, led by Viktor Prakenskii, which was introduced in Bound Together.

GhostWalkers Novels 
 The GhostWalker novels revolve around an elite squadron of men and women who, through secret experimentation, can be transformed into extraordinary weapons.

Leopard Novels 
This series focuses on shape-shifting leopards.  Each book focuses on a mated couple who are destined to be together and have been together in other lifetimes.

Shadow Riders Novels 
This series is about a Chicago crime family that hides a dark, mystical secret.

Sunrise Lake Novels 
Stand-alone novels that take place at Sunrise Lake resort. At this time, this is not considered an official series.

Stand Alone Novels

Collections and Anthologies

References

Feehan, Christine